Labor Standards Act is a Labour law in South Korea since 1953.

See also 
 Jeon Tae-il

External links 

 Labor Standards Act, National Legislation Information Center 

1953 in law
South Korean labour law
Occupational safety and health law
1953 in South Korea
1953 in labor relations